Edward Peter (1902 – 15 January 1985) was a Trinidadian cricketer. He played in one first-class match for Trinidad and Tobago in 1936/37.

See also
 List of Trinidadian representative cricketers

References

External links
 

1902 births
1985 deaths
Trinidad and Tobago cricketers